The following is a list of notable deaths in May 2008.

Entries for each day are listed alphabetically by surname. A typical entry lists information in the following sequence:
 Name, age, country of citizenship at birth, subsequent country of citizenship (if applicable), reason for notability, cause of death (if known), and reference.

May 2008

1
Aden Hashi Farah Ayro, Somalian politician and Al-Shabaab member, air strike.
Paulo Amaral, 84, Brazilian football player (Flamengo) and coach (Juventus).
SM Nasimuddin SM Amin, 54, Malaysian entrepreneur and founder of Naza, lung cancer.
Bernard Archard, 91, British actor (Krull, Doctor Who, Emmerdale).
Buzzie Bavasi, 93, American baseball executive (Dodgers, Angels, Padres).
Mary Berry, 90, British musicologist and nun.
Philipp von Boeselager, 90, German World War II anti-Hitler conspirator.
Nirmala Deshpande, 78, Indian peace activist, after brief illness.
Elaine Dundy, 86, American writer and actress.
Aden Hashi Farah, Somali leader of Al-Shabab insurgent group, air strike.
Jim Hager, 61, American country music singer and television actor (Hee Haw), heart attack.
Mark Kendall, 49, British footballer (Spurs, Newport, Wolves).
Sir Anthony Mamo, 99, Maltese politician, first president of the Republic of Malta.
Alberto Estima de Oliveira, 74, Portuguese poet.
Deborah Jeane Palfrey, 52, American escort agency proprietor, suicide by hanging.
Marcel Van Der Auwera, 84, Belgian fencer.
J. J. Voskuil, 81, Dutch novelist.

2
Josephine Apieu Jenaro Aken, 53, South Sudanese civil servant, plane crash.
Robert Brachtenbach, 77, American jurist, Washington State Supreme Court justice (1972–1994), throat cancer.
Carole Dekeijser, 48, Belgian painter, lung cancer.
Dominic Dim Deng, 58, Sudanese politician, defence minister for Southern Sudan, plane crash.
Robert M. Isaac, 80, American politician, mayor of Colorado Springs, Colorado (1979–1997), pneumonia.
Sergio Lauricella, 86, Italian Olympic bronze medal-winning (1948) composer.
Mildred Loving, 68, American civil rights pioneer, challenged Virginia interracial marriage law (Loving v. Virginia).
Ilyas Malayev, 72, Uzbekistani musician and poet, pancreatic cancer.
Beverlee McKinsey, 72, American soap opera actress (Another World, Guiding Light), complications from kidney transplant.
Izold Pustõlnik, 70, Ukrainian-born Estonian astronomer.
Daniel Sekhoto, 37, South African football player.
Mike Titcomb, 75, British rugby union referee, kidney failure.
Frank Y. Whiteley, Jr., 93, American thoroughbred racehorse trainer (Ruffian).
Justin Yak, Sudanese politician, minister for cabinet affairs for Southern Sudan (2006–2007), plane crash.

3
Charles Caccia, 78, Canadian politician, environmentalist, Liberal MP for Davenport (1968–2004), complications of stroke.
Leopoldo Calvo-Sotelo, 82, Spanish prime minister (1981–1982), natural causes.
Eight Belles, 3, American racehorse, 2008 Kentucky Derby 2nd-place finisher, euthanized.
Martin Finnegan, 27, Irish motorbike racer, race crash.
Fay Gale, 75, Australian cultural geographer.
Lynne Cooper Harvey, 92, American radio producer, Radio Hall of Fame member, wife of Paul Harvey, leukemia.
Ted Key, 95, American cartoonist (Hazel), bladder cancer and stroke.
Hanon Reznikov, 57, American playwright.
Morgan Sparks, 91, American engineer, inventor of the first practical bipolar junction transistor.
*Ngugi wa Mirii, 57, Kenyan playwright, car accident.

4
Roger Aeschlimann, 84, Swiss cyclist.
John Altieri, 38, American actor (Jersey Boys), pneumonia.
Fred Baur, 89, American chemist, inventor of the Pringles can.
Alvin Colt, 92, American Tony Award-winning costume designer (On the Town, Guys and Dolls, Pipe Dream, Li'l Abner).
John Greenwood, 57, British businessman and catering executive, motor neurone disease.
Fred Haines, 72, American screenwriter and film director, lung cancer.
Richard Holme, Baron Holme of Cheltenham, 71, British Liberal Democrat politician, cancer.
Kishan Maharaj, 84, Indian musician, leading exponent of the Benares gharana tabla, stroke.
Colin Murdoch, 79, New Zealand inventor of the disposable hypodermic syringe and the tranquilizer gun, cancer.

5
Sam Aubrey, 85, American basketball player and coach (Oklahoma State Cowboys).
Thomas Boggs, 63, American drummer (Box Tops), owner of Huey's Restaurants. 
Hugh Bradner, 92, American scientist credited with inventing the wetsuit, complications of pneumonia.
*Pak Kyongni, 82, South Korean novelist, lung cancer.
Irv Robbins, 90, American businessman, co-founder of the Baskin-Robbins ice cream chain.
Zvonko Sabolović, 84, Yugoslav Olympic sprinter.
Alma Hogan Snell, 85, American Crow tribal nation historian, herbalist, granddaughter of Pretty Shield.
Jerry Wallace, 79, American country music singer, heart failure.
Witold Woyda, 68, Polish fencer, double gold medallist at the 1972 Summer Olympics, lung cancer.

6
John Jay Iselin, 74, American public television innovator, descendant of John Jay, pneumonia.
Franz Jackson, 95, American saxophonist.
Harvey Karman, 84, American psychologist and women's reproductive health advocate, inventor of the Karman cannula, stroke.
William Earl Lynd, 53, American convicted murderer, executed by lethal injection.
Ray Michie, Baroness Michie of Gallanach, 74, British Liberal Democrat politician, cancer.
D.C. Minner, 73, American blues musician.
John Reames, 65, British football manager and administrator, cancer.
Mark Saunders, 32, British barrister, shot by police.

7
William Douglas Allen, 94, British physicist and electrical engineer.
John Earle, 64, Irish saxophonist.
Neeraj Grover, 26, Indian television executive and producer (Kya Aap Paanchvi Pass Se Tez Hain?), beaten.
Rachel Hoffman, 23, American police informant, murdered.
Clifford L. Jones, 80, American politician, Pennsylvania Republican Party chairman, prostate cancer.
Donald Montrose, 84, American Roman Catholic prelate, Bishop of Stockton (1986–1999).
Thijs Wöltgens, 64, Dutch politician, mayor of Kerkrade (1994–2000), senator (1995–2005).
Gernot Zippe, 90, Austrian engineer.

8
Al-Bandari bint Abdulaziz, 80, Saudi sister of King Abdullah of Saudi Arabia.
Eddy Arnold, 89, American country music singer.
Willem Brakman, 85, Dutch author.
Ian Brodie, 72, British foreign correspondent (The Daily Telegraph).
Jose Feria, 91, Filipino supreme court justice (1986–1987).
Yasuharu Furuta, 93, Japanese Olympic hurdler.
Murray Jarvik, 84, American academic and co-inventor of the nicotine patch, heart failure.
Larry Levine, 80, American Grammy-winning audio engineer (Wall of Sound), emphysema.
Luigi Malerba, 81, Italian writer.
*Édgar Eusebio Millán Gómez, 41, Mexican federal police anti-drug coordinator, shot.
François Sterchele, 26, Belgian footballer (Belgium, Club Brugge), car accident.

9
James Atkinson, 92, British physicist.
Firoz Dastur, 89, Indian Hindustani classical musician (Kirana Gharana), anaemia.
Jack Gibson, 79, Australian rugby league player and coach, selected as "Coach of the Century".
Judy Grable, 72, American female professional wrestler.
Shmuel Katz, 93, Israeli writer, historian and journalist.
Arthur Kroeger, 76, Canadian civil servant (1958–1992), academic and chancellor of Carleton University (1993–2002).
Baptiste Manzini, 87, American football player.
Nuala O'Faolain, 68, Irish journalist and author, lung cancer.
Mamadou N'Diaye, 68, Senegalese Olympic sprinter.
Ronald Parise, 56, American astronaut, brain tumor.
Esteban Robles Espinosa, Mexican police commander, shot.
Pascal Sevran, 62, French television presenter and producer, lyricist and writer, lung cancer.
Sinan Sofuoğlu, 25, Turkish motorcycle racer, training crash.
Artur da Távola, 72, Brazilian journalist, writer and politician, heart disease.

10
Sir John Barraclough, 90, British air marshal.
Leyla Gencer, 79, Turkish soprano opera singer, respiratory and cardiac failure.
Paul Haeberlin, 84, French chef and restaurateur (L'Auberge de l'Ill). 
Jessica Jacobs, 17, Australian singer and actress (The Saddle Club), fell under train.
*Liao Feng-Teh, 57, Taiwanese incoming interior minister, heart attack.
Eusebio Ríos, 73, Spanish international footballer and coach.
Mario Schiano, 74, Italian jazz saxophonist, after long Illness.
Peter Thurnham, 69, British MP for Bolton North East (1983–1997), pancreatic cancer.

11
Sir Austin Bide, 92, British chemist and industrialist.
Sam Dauya, 70, Zimbabwean founder of Dynamos F.C. football team.
Alema Leota, 80, American alleged organized crime leader, 1978 candidate for governor of Hawaii, injuries from car accident.
Raymattja Marika, 49, Australian Yolngu scholar, linguist, educator and cultural advocate, heart attack.
Bruno Neves, 27, Portuguese cyclist, crash during race.
Dottie Rambo, 74, American gospel singer, bus crash.
John Rutsey, 55, Canadian drummer (Rush), heart attack.
Heather Stohler, 29, American model for Calvin Klein, fire.
Dick Sutcliffe, 90, American animator, creator of Davey and Goliath, stroke.
Jeff Torrington, 72, British novelist (Swing Hammer Swing), Parkinson's disease.
Curtis Whitley, 39, American football player (San Diego Chargers, Carolina Panthers, Oakland Raiders).

12
Seton Airlie, 88, Scottish footballer.
Penny Banner, 73, American professional wrestler, cancer.
David Daniels, 74, American poet.
Oakley Hall, 87, American novelist (Warlock), kidney disease and cancer.
Lidiya Masterkova, 81, Russian-born French painter.
Natural Blitz, 7–8, Australian-bred stallion.
Robert Rauschenberg, 82, American pop artist, heart failure.
Bruce Sayers, 80, British electrical engineer.
Irena Sendler, 98, Polish humanitarian, saved 2500 Jewish children from the Warsaw Ghetto during World War II.

13
Jill Adams, 77, British actress, cancer.
Saad Al-Salim Al-Sabah, 78, Kuwaiti emir (2006).
Dolores Alexander, 76, American feminist, writer, and reporter.
Charles Gary Allison, 69–70, American screenwriter and film producer.
Charles Buell Anderson, 81, American Christian, the founder of Endeavor Academy.
Lucius D. Battle, 89, American ambassador to Egypt (1964–1967), Parkinson's disease.
Bernardin Gantin, 86, Beninese cardinal of the Roman Catholic Church.
John Phillip Law, 70, American actor (Barbarella).
Larry McKeon, 63, American politician, first openly gay member of the Illinois General Assembly, stroke.
Colea Răutu, 95, Romanian actor, cirrhosis.
Ron Stone, 72, American news anchor (KHOU, KPRC in Houston), prostate cancer.
Costică Toma, 80, Romanian football goalkeeper (Romania, Steaua București).
Maheswary Velautham, Sri Lankan lawyer and activist, shot.
Roger Harold Metford Warner, 95, British antiques dealer.

14
Frith Banbury, 96, British stage director and actor, liver cancer.
Dagmar Barnouw, 72, German cultural historian.
Arthur Burks, 92, American mathematician and computer pioneer, Alzheimer's disease.
Warren Cowan, 87, American publicist, cancer.
Roger Ellis, 70, American football player, cancer.
John Forbes-Robertson, 80, British actor.
Derek Goodwin, 88, British ornithologist.
Roy Heath, 81, Guyanese writer.
Jay Morago, 90, American governor of the Gila River Indian Community (1954–1960), cancer.
Tonderai Ndira, 33, Zimbabwean political dissident, murdered.
Yuri Rytkheu, 78, Russian Chukchi language writer.
Mário Schoemberger, 56, Brazilian film, television and stage actor, cancer.
Richard David Vine, 82, American diplomat, ambassador to Switzerland (1979–1981).

15
Del Ankers, 91, American cinematographer and photographer (Muppets commercials).
Henry Austin, 88, Indian diplomat and politician, ambassador to Portugal.
Tommy Burns, 51, Scottish football player and manager (Celtic, Kilmarnock, Reading), melanoma.
Tove Billington Bye, 79, Norwegian politician.
Alexander Courage, 88, American orchestrator and film composer.
Anthony Denness, 71, English cricketer.
Walt Dickerson, 80, American vibraphonist, cardiac arrest.
Robert Dunlop, 47, British motorcycle racer, chest injuries.
Will Elder, 86, American comic book artist (Mad, Little Annie Fanny), Parkinson's disease.
Bob Florence, 75, American jazz composer and arranger, pneumonia. 
Youssef Idilbi, 32, Dutch actor, suicide.
Willis Lamb, 94, American physicist, Nobel laureate in physics (1955), complications of gallstone disorder.
Earl Leggett, 75, American football player and coach.
Yanks Music, 14, American Thoroughbred racehorse, euthanized.

16
Charles J. Adams, 91, American politician.
Aonosato Sakari, 72, Japanese sumo wrestler.
William Blease, Baron Blease, 93, British politician.
Henry Canoy, 84, Filipino businessman, founder of Radio Mindanao Network.
Sandy Howard, 80, American film and television producer (A Man Called Horse), Alzheimer's disease.
David Mitton, 69, British animation director (Thomas & Friends, Thunderbirds), heart attack.
Robert Mondavi, 94, American winemaker, benefactor of the Mondavi Center, member of the California Hall of Fame.
Igor Polyakov, 95, Russian rower, 1952 Olympic silver medalist.
Marc Rabémila, 70, Malagasy Olympic athlete.
Jimmy Slyde, 80, American tap dancer.
Peter Rolfe Vaughan, 73, English scientist, heart attack.

17
*Jolyon Brettingham Smith, 58, British composer, musicologist and radio presenter.
John Fitzsimmons, 68, British Roman Catholic priest and broadcaster, after long illness.
Thomas Flatley, 76, American real estate tycoon and philanthropist, amyotrophic lateral sclerosis.
Zélia Gattai, 91, Brazilian writer and novelist, wife of Jorge Amado.
Wilfrid Mellers, 94, British composer and author.
D. Aubrey Moodie, 99, Canadian politician.
Jack Rayner, 87, Australian rugby league player.
Sophan Sophiaan, 64, Indonesian actor and politician, motorcycle accident.
Joyce Trimmer, 80, Canadian politician, mayor of Scarborough, Ontario (1988–1994), cancer.
Lionel Van Deerlin, 93, American politician and journalist, representative from California (1963–1981).

18
Lionel Algama, 73, Sri Lankan singer, composer and a musician.
Pietro Cascella, 87, Italian contemporary artist.
Irma Córdoba, 94, Argentine actress, natural causes.
Jonathan James, 24, American cyber criminal.
John Lucas, 85, Barbadian-born Canadian cricketer.
Lloyd Moore, 95, American NASCAR driver (1949–1955).
Elemore Morgan, Jr., 76, American landscape artist.
Jack Norris, 99, American football player.
Joseph Pevney, 96, American television and film director (Bonanza, Star Trek, The Paper Chase, Trapper John, M.D.).

19
Bill Andress, 83, American baseball umpire.
Nigel Cassidy, 62, British footballer.
Larry Coutre, 80, American football player (Green Bay Packers).
Jack Duffy, 81, Canadian comedian, natural causes.
Chaim Flom, Israeli scholar and rosh yeshiva.
Huntington Hartford, 97, American businessman and philanthropist.
Barclay Howard, 55, British golfer.
Rimma Kazakova, 76, Russian poet.
Mariam McGlone, 92, American dancer and choreographer.
Kjell Kristian Rike, 63, Norwegian sports commentator.
André Schlupp, 78, French Olympic basketball player.
Vijay Tendulkar, 80, Indian playwright, myasthenia gravis.

20
Iona Banks, 87, British actress (Pobol y Cwm).
Crispin Beltran, 75, Filipino congressman and labor leader, head injuries from a fall.
Viktor Bortsov, 73, Russian actor, intestinal cancer. 
Margot Boyd, 94, British actress (The Archers).
Thomas Burlison, Baron Burlison, 71, British footballer and trade unionist.
Charles William John Eliot, 79, Canadian academic administrator, president of the University of Prince Edward Island (1985–1995), complications of a stroke.
Joachim Erwin, 58, German politician, mayor of Düsseldorf, colorectal cancer.
Gonzalo Figueroa Garcia Huidobro, 77, Chilean archaeologist.
Herb Hash, 97, American baseball pitcher (Boston Red Sox), stroke.
Harald Hein, 58, German Olympic fencer.
Zelma Henderson, 88, American last surviving plaintiff in Brown v. Board of Education, pancreatic cancer.
Hamilton Jordan, 63, American politician, Jimmy Carter's White House chief of staff (1979–1980), mesothelioma.
Baine Kerr, 88, American lawyer and oil executive.
Cy Leonard, 82, Canadian ventriloquist.
Ali Sadikin, 80, Indonesian politician, governor of Jakarta (1966–1977), liver cancer.
S. K. Trimurti, 96, Indonesian journalist, first minister of labor and employment, natural causes.

21
Bert André, 66, Dutch actor (Flodder), intracranial hemorrhage
Earl Wesley Berry, 49, American convicted murderer, execution by lethal injection.
Mel Casson, 87, American cartoonist (Redeye).
Brian Keenan, 66, Irish IRA commander, cancer.
Ted Lanyon, 68, Canadian ice hockey player.
Michelle Meldrum, 39, American rock guitarist (Phantom Blue, Meldrum), cystic growth on the brain.
John Aloysius Morgan, 98, Australian Roman Catholic prelate.
Siegmund Nissel, 86, German-born British violinist (Amadeus Quartet).
Bartolomeu Cid dos Santos, 77, Portuguese artist and engraver, long illness.
Torcato Sepúlveda, 57, Portuguese journalist.
Jeheskel Shoshani, 65, Israeli-born American elephant expert, bus explosion.

22
Melek Amet, 47, Romanian model, ovarian cancer.
Robert Asprin, 61, American science fiction and fantasy writer (MythAdventures), heart attack.
Charlie Booth, 104, Australian athlete, inventor of the starting block.
Harry Lange, 77, German astronautical illustrator and film production designer (2001: A Space Odyssey, Star Wars).
Jack Mildren, 58, American football player, Oklahoma's lieutenant governor (1990–1995), stomach cancer.
Paul Patrick, 58, British gay rights activist, chronic lung condition.
Hana Maria Pravda, 90, Czech actress and Holocaust survivor.
Tubby T, 33, British dancehall/garage musician, stroke.

23
Nigel Anderson, 88, British soldier, landowner, and politician.
Alan Brien, 83, British journalist and critic.
Cornell Capa, 90, American photographer, founder of the International Center of Photography.
Roberto Freire, 81, Brazilian writer and psychiatrist, created somatherapy.
Dritan Hoxha, 39, Albanian businessman, car accident.
Thelma Keane, 82, Australian-born American who inspired husband Bil's comic strip The Family Circus, Alzheimer's disease.
Heinz Kwiatkowski, 81, German footballer, member of 1954 FIFA World Cup-winning team.
Iñaki Ochoa de Olza, 40, Spanish mountaineer and alpinist, pulmonary edema while climbing Annapurna.
Jefferson Peres, 76, Brazilian senator from Amazonas, heart attack. 
Utah Phillips, 73, American folk singer and political activist, heart failure.
Jack Smith, 72, English football player (Hartlepool United, Swindon Town, Margate) and manager.

24
Adam Baruch, 63, Israeli journalist, writer and art critic, diabetes complications.
Bob Beck, 63, Guamanian zoologist and conservationist, worked to save Guam rail native birds.
Tano Cimarosa, 86, Italian actor.
Reg Flewin, 87, British footballer.
Rob Knox, 18, British actor (Harry Potter and the Half-Blood Prince), stabbed.
Eugenio Garza Lagüera, 84, Mexican businessman, president of FEMSA, natural causes.
Isaac Lipschits, 77, Dutch political scientist and historian, natural causes.
Dick Martin, 86, American comedian (Rowan & Martin's Laugh-In), respiratory complications.
Jimmy McGriff, 72, American jazz and blues organist, multiple sclerosis.
Sonny Okosun, 61, Nigerian musician, colon cancer.

25
Nadia Arslan, 59, Lebanese actress, breast cancer.
Louise Firouz, 74, American horse breeder.
George Garrett, 78, American novelist and poet, cancer.
Geremi González, 33, Venezuelan MLB baseball player, lightning strike.
James D. Griffin, 78, American mayor of Buffalo, New York (1978–1994), Creutzfeldt–Jakob disease.
Bukhuti Gurgenidze, 74, Georgian chess grandmaster.
Ítalo Argentino Lúder, 91, Argentine acting president (1975).
Tom McHale, 45, American football player (Tampa Bay Buccaneers).
Mitch Mullany, 39, American comedian and actor (Nick Freno: Licensed Teacher), diabetes-related stroke.
J. R. Simplot, 99, American businessman, original McDonald's french fries supplier.
Olaf Sørensen, 90, Danish Olympic runner.
Ernst Stuhlinger, 94, German-born American rocket scientist.
Camu Tao, 30, American rapper-producer, lung cancer.
Kenneth H. Wood, 90, American author and administrator, editor of the Adventist Review, heart failure.

26
Dolly Aglay, 41, Filipino financial journalist, cancer.
Jerry C. Begay, 83, American Navajo code talker and World War II veteran.
Dick Evans, 90, American football player (Green Bay Packers, Chicago Cardinals).
Hans Haasmann, 92, Dutch Olympic diver 
Earle Hagen, 88, American composer of film and television theme music (The Andy Griffith Show, The Mod Squad).
Howlin' Dave, 52, Filipino radio disc jockey and proponent of Pinoy rock, stroke.
John Hulme, 63, English footballer (Bolton Wanderers, Reading, Bury).
Roy Koerner, 75, British polar scientist and explorer.
Yuriy Konovalov, 78, Soviet-born Azerbaijani Olympic track athlete, 4 × 100 m relay silver medallist (1956 and 1960). 
Donald L. Pilling, 64, American admiral, Vice Chief of Naval Operations (1997–2000), leukemia.
Sydney Pollack, 73, American film director and actor (Tootsie, Out of Africa, Michael Clayton), Oscar winner (1986), stomach cancer.
Alan Renouf, 89, Australian head of DFAT, ambassador to United States (1977–1979), France and Yugoslavia, leukemia.
Kermit Scott, 71, American philosophy professor, namesake of Kermit the Frog.
Robert G. Voight, 87, American academic.

27
Ed Arno, 91, Austrian-American cartoonist, caricaturist, illustrator and comics artist.
Valmae Beck, 64, Australian child murderer, complications of heart surgery.
Tony Hussein Hinde, 55, Australian-born Maldivian surfer, heart attack.
Franz Künstler, 107, German World War I veteran, last known surviving veteran of the Central Powers.
Hubert Macey, 87, Canadian ice hockey player (Montreal Canadiens, New York Rangers).
Per Nielsen, 88, Danish Olympic shooter.
Mick Nolan, 58, Australian footballer, cancer.
Neal Potter, 93, American politician.
Abram Raselemane, 30, South African footballer, apparent suicide.
Alejandro Romualdo, 82, Peruvian poet.
Keith Rosewarne, 83, Australian footballer.

28
Beryl Cook, 81, British painter.
Sven Davidson, 79, Swedish tennis player.
Robert H. Justman, 81, American television and film producer (Star Trek), Parkinson's disease.
Elinor Lyon, 86, British children's writer.
Danny Moss, 80, British jazz tenor saxophonist.
Nashoba's Key, 5, American racehorse, euthanized.
Dianne Odell, 61, American author with polio, power failure to iron lung.
Erin Spanevello, 21, Canadian fashion model, drug overdose.

29
Paula Gunn Allen, 68, Native American poet, novelist, and activist, lung cancer.
José Alejandro Bernales, 59, Chilean director general of Carabineros de Chile, helicopter crash.
Luc Bourdon, 21, Canadian ice hockey player, motorcycle accident.
Romeo A. Brawner, 72, Filipino appeals court judge (1995–2005), election commissioner (2005–2008), heart attack.
Len Devine, 84, Australian politician, MP for East Sydney (1963–1969).
Harvey Korman, 81, American actor and comedian (Blazing Saddles, The Carol Burnett Show, The Flintstones), abdominal aortic aneurysm.
Donald MacLeod, 75, New Zealand cricketer.

30
Harry Brautigam, 59, Nicaraguan president of the BCIE since 2003, heart problem after air crash.
Campbell Burnap, 68, British jazz trombonist, cancer.
Harlan Cleveland, 90, American diplomat, educator and author, ambassador to NATO (1965–1969), natural causes.
Rodney Gordon, 75, British architect.
Graeme Miller, 67, Australian cricketer.
Noel Moore, 79, British civil servant, leader of decimalisation project, brain tumour.
Chris Morgan, 55, British journalist, apparent suicide in front of a train.
William Eldridge Odom, 75, American Army Lieutenant General and director of the National Security Agency.
Lorenzo Odone, 30, American ALD patient portrayed in the film Lorenzo's Oil.
Mike Scott, 75, British television producer and presenter.
Boris Shakhlin, 76, Russian-born Ukrainian gymnast, winner of seven Olympic gold medals for the Soviet Union, cardiac arrest.
Suprakash Som, 60, Indian cricketer.
Nat Temple, 94, British bandleader.

31
Carlos Alhinho, 59, Portuguese international footballer, fall.
John Ambler, 83, British businessman.
Joe Axelson, 80, American executive and general manager of the National Basketball Association Sacramento Kings.
Nusret Çolpan, 56, Turkish painter and architect.
Detlef Gromoll, 70, American mathematician, brain hemorrhage.
Nelly Láinez, 88, Argentine actress, urinary infection.
Per-Erik Larsson, 79, Swedish skier.
Charles Moskos, 74, American sociologist, architect of the US military DADT gay and lesbian policy, cancer.
Paul Thomson, 91, American botanist, co-founder of the California Rare Fruit Growers Association.
Allan Wiles, 87, New Zealand cricketer.

References

2008-05
Deaths in May